Ephedra multiflora is a species of Ephedra that is native to northern Chile and Northwest Argentina.

Taxonomy
The  plant was originally described by Rodolfo Armando Philippi, later formally published by Otto Stapf in 1887, and placed in section Ephedra sect. Alatae, "tribe" Habrolepides by Stapf in 1889.

In 1996 Robert A. Price left E. multiflora in section Alatae without recognizing a tribe.

References 

multiflora
Flora of the Andes
Flora of Argentina
Flora of Chile